The first year of Creighton Bluejays football was in 1900. They fielded a football team every year from 1900 to 1942. The first team photo is from 1893, but first played in 1900.

History

Nickname
Creighton adopted a Bluejay as its mascot in 1924, when the University's athletic board selected the name from submissions for a contest run by the Omaha Bee newspaper.

Conference championships

Creighton won three conference titles. The Bluejays won two North Central Conference championships and one Missouri Valley Conference championship.

Record versus Missouri Valley Conference

See also
List of Creighton Bluejays football seasons

References

 
American football teams established in 1900
1900 establishments in Nebraska